Edward James Gregory (29 May 1839 – 22 April 1899) was an Australian cricketer who played in the first recognised Test in 1877 between Australia and England in Melbourne.

Ned was the father of a famous Australian cricketer, Syd Gregory, and brother of Dave Gregory who captained the first Australian eleven in England in 1878. Ned was also father-in-law of Harry Donnan. In the latter part of his life he was custodian of the Association ground at Sydney (later to be known as the Sydney Cricket Ground) after building the scoreboard there.

Ned Gregory and Nat Thomson are indicated by Wisden to have been born on the same day, and thus jointly were the earliest-born Australian Test cricketers.

See also
One Test Wonder

External links 
 
 Find-A-Grave profile for Ned Gregory

1839 births
1899 deaths
Australia Test cricketers
New South Wales cricketers
Australian cricketers
Cricketers from Sydney